Everton Fernando Gilio (born 18 March 1986), commonly known as Tom, is a retired Brazilian footballer who played as a midfielder, and current scout of Bulgarian club FC CSKA 1948 Sofia.

Career
Tom was raised in Atlético Paranaense and Palmeiras's youths teams. In the first half of 2007 he played for Palmeiras B, appearing in 6 games with one goal in the Campeonato Paulista Série A2. Then he signed for Taquaritinga.

Having had an unsuccessful trial with CSKA Sofia in January 2008, Tom joined Lokomotiv Plovdiv. On 22 February 2008, he signed a 3-year contract with Lokomotiv.

Lokomotiv Sofia
On 18 January 2013, Tom signed with Lokomotiv Sofia on a one-and-a-half-year deal. He made his competitive debut for the club in a league game against Lokomotiv Plovdiv on 2 March, playing the full 90 minutes. On 13 April 2013, Tom was sent off after receiving two yellow cards in Lokomotiv's 2–1 loss against Levski Sofia at Georgi Asparuhov Stadium.

On 25 July 2014, Tom signed a one-year contract extension, keeping him at Lokomotiv until 30 June 2015. He had a second stint with the "railwaymen" between the summer of 2019 and April 2020, becoming team captain.

Later career
In January 2021, Tom signed with OFC Spartak Pleven. 

In November 2021, Tom joined FC CSKA 1948 Sofia as the clubs new scout.

References

External links
 

1986 births
Living people
Sportspeople from Paraná (state)
Brazilian footballers
Brazilian expatriate footballers
Association football midfielders
Clube Atlético Taquaritinga players
PFC Lokomotiv Plovdiv players
PFC Minyor Pernik players
FC Lokomotiv 1929 Sofia players
PFC Beroe Stara Zagora players
Batatais Futebol Clube players
First Professional Football League (Bulgaria) players
Brazilian expatriate sportspeople in Bulgaria
Expatriate footballers in Bulgaria